Lionel William Augustus Glendenning, B.Arch., M.Arch.(Harvard) (born 1941) is an Australian architect.

Career
In 1959 Glendenning was appointed architectural draftsman with the (NSW) Department of Public Works, and promoted to architect in 1967.

Glendenning was 1968 Harvard Menzies Scholar.

Glendenning was the architect behind the Powerhouse Museum.

References 

20th-century Australian architects
Architects from Sydney
1941 births
Living people
Harvard Graduate School of Design alumni